New Economics Party (NEP) is a political party in Thailand founded in March 2018 by Supadit Arkartruek.

Election results

References 

Political parties in Thailand
2018 establishments in Thailand
Political parties established in 2018
Organizations based in Bangkok